Silk is a Korean-American superhero appearing in American comic books published by Marvel Comics. Silk is the alias of Cindy Moon, who first appeared in The Amazing Spider-Man #1 (April 2014) and was created by Dan Slott and Humberto Ramos. She was a member of the Spider-Army / Web-Warriors and Agents of Atlas.

She was portrayed by Tiffany Espensen in the Marvel Cinematic Universe (MCU) films Spider-Man: Homecoming (2017) and Avengers: Infinity War (2018). The character will also appear in the television series Silk: Spider Society produced by Sony Pictures Television for MGM+ and Amazon Prime Video, set in Sony's Spider-Man Universe (SSU), and an untitled film set in the animated Spider-Verse franchise, focusing on three generations of female Spider-related characters.

Publication history
The character first appeared in The Amazing Spider-Man vol. 3 #1 (April 2014) as a faceless cameo and was created by writer Dan Slott and artist Humberto Ramos. She made several other faceless appearances throughout the volume's first story arc, before making her full debut in The Amazing Spider-Man vol. 3 #4 (July 2014), as part of a tie-in to the "Original Sin" storyline. An ongoing title featuring Silk started publishing in February 2015, with scripts by Supernatural writer Robbie Thompson and art by Stacey Lee. Silk volume 1 came to an end during the Secret Wars event. After the event, a second volume began which concluded with issue #19.

Silk was part of the new Agents of Atlas team, which debuted in a War of the Realms tie-in and later got their own five-issue limited series.

A third Silk ongoing series was set to be published in July 2020 by writer Maurene Goo and artist Takeshi Miyazawa, but it was withheld due to the ongoing COVID-19 pandemic. The series was released in March 2021 as a five-issue limited series.

A fourth Silk series was released in January 2022 by writer Emily Kim with Takeshi Miyazawa returning as artist.

Fictional character biography

Thirteen years ago during a demonstration on the use of radioactive rays at a science exhibit, a spider is accidentally exposed to large amounts of radiation. In its dying moments, the arachnid bites Peter Parker. As a result, the young teenager gains amazing powers and becomes Spider-Man. However, this is not the end. Mere moments after biting Parker, the spider bites another young student named Cindy Moon. Soon after, Cindy's abilities, including organic webbing (unlike Peter), manifest but she is unable to control them. Some time later, Ezekiel approaches the Moon family to offer his help and guide Cindy in controlling her newfound abilities. After six years training to use her powers, Cindy is locked up inside a facility by Ezekiel to protect her and the other "spiders" from Morlun and his family called the Inheritors.

Original Sin
Seven years later during the "Original Sin" storyline, Spider-Man is exposed to the energies of the Watcher's eye. He receives a vision of the radioactive spider that bit him also biting Cindy Moon, and learns what happened to her afterwards. Spider-Man immediately goes on to search for Cindy to break her out of the facility Ezekiel had kept her in. After freeing Cindy, she attacks Spider-Man in a fit of rage saying that he has doomed them all. Spider-Man calms Cindy down by telling her that Morlun is dead. Cindy makes her way out of the facility to finally see the city of New York, stopping only to make a costume out of her webbing. She tells Spider-Man to refer to her as Silk. Silk is heartbroken to find that her family has moved. Silk and Peter also find that they are powerfully attracted to each other due to their shared spider-sense. Silk finds out that Morlun might be still alive, which causes her to attack Peter. However, their attraction makes them kiss. Peter stops as soon as Cindy begins to remove his mask, after which they move back to Peter and Anna Maria's apartment. Afterwards, Peter and Cindy go to the Fact Channel's news station where they are attacked by Black Cat and Electro. While Silk is easily able to dodge Electro's lightning bolts thanks to her "hyper-spider-speed and senses," Spider-Man isn't as lucky. Black Cat then goes after the paralyzed superhero and begins to unmask him in front of live TV. Luckily, J. Jonah Jameson takes up too much space in front of the camera, preventing the camera (and anyone else) from seeing Peter's face. Silk quickly spins a temporary mask for Peter and escapes with him back into Peter and Anna Maria's apartment. At the waterfront where Parker Industries will be holding the demonstration for their new device meant to cure Electro, Cindy spins Peter some Electro-insulated webbing to prevent what happened during their last fight with Electro from happening again. When the fight begins, Black Cat sabotages the machine which causes Electro to go out of control and hit a helicopter. Silk hurries and begins spinning porous webs to catch the crashing helicopter. She then creates an insulated web-pod to contain the inevitable explosion of energy coming from Electro. The entire incident ends with a depowered Electro and a missing Black Cat. Afterwards, Cindy gets accepted for a job at the Fact Channel where she intends to use the information center in order to find her family.

Spider-Verse
During the "Spider-Verse" storyline, Spider-Man and Silk discuss their problem in which whenever they get close, they feel the need to have intimate interactions as well as possible solutions to this. They end up fighting Looter and his henchmen where they are stealing equipment and Spiderling costumes from Spider-Island II. Spider-Man and Silk manage to defeat them with the help of Spider-Woman, Spider-Anya, and Spider-Man 2099 as the final henchman is defeated by Spider-Girl of Earth-982, Spider-UK, and Spider-Ham. Silk accompanies the other spider-themed heroes through the portal to Earth-13. When Spider-Man wants Silk to be among those to accompany him to gather the other spider-themed heroes, Old Man Spider-Man of Earth-4 advises that Silk should stay behind. Silk ends up following anyway which later angers Old Man Spider-Man when they arrive on Earth-928. He mentioned that Silk shouldn't have left her bunker. After Daemos was slain, Superior Spider-Man (Otto Octavius's mind in Peter Parker's body) blames Silk for Daemos' attack and suggests that they kill her. When Brix, Bora, and a Daemos clone arrive and kill Old Man Spider-Man Silk steals Spider-Man's portal device, intending to set right the deaths she caused and opens a portal while attracting the Inheritors' attention. Spider-Woman volunteers to follow Silk while Superior Spider-Man sends Spider-Man Noir to accompany them. After Spider-Man of Earth-90214 was badly injured, Silk and Spider-Woman take him back to Earth-90214 so that he can recuperate. Superior Spider-Man expresses concern since the Inheritors have already been there, but Spider-Man says Silk should be safe as long as she keeps moving and takes one of Superior Spider-Man's cloaking devices. Spider-Gwen and Spider-Girl (Anya Corazon) are assigned to supervise Silk, but she runs off on her own with Brix and Bora hot on her trail. Her teleporter is broken and she is surrounded by the Inheritor twins, leading her to escape into Earth-001. She then finds Jessica Drew 616 impersonating that dimension's Jessica Drew. She uses her teleporter to escape, but ends up in Earth-3145 - a post-thermonuclear war world which the Inheritors cannot attack due to their vulnerability to radiation. Silk is able to survive by creating a web-suit to shield her from radiation. She finds her way to this dimension's Sims building and meets that dimension's spider totem, Ben Parker, in a nuclear bunker. She then sends clues to the other spiders of the safe zone and goes back to Earth-001 to save Jessica Drew, but gets captured by the Inheritors. She is revealed to be The Bride, one of the three key totems. During the final sacrifice of the three key totems, the Spider Army are able to stop the Inheritors and save her and Benjy Parker from being sacrificed. After Superior Spider-Man kills the Grand Weaver, she volunteers to take his place, but Karn decides to be the new Weaver, since through a time paradox he was the weaver all along. Silk, Jessica Drew, and Spider-Man return to Earth-616.

Silk solo series
After arriving back in New York, Silk begins a career of crime-fighting while searching for her family after ten years, as well as continuing her job as a Fact Channel intern. Wanting to move focus on the search for them, Cindy moves out of her friend's apartment and moves back into her old bunker, which she uses as a base of operations. Discovering that her family has no official records of being around, save for some old files, she goes to her old neighborhood. Here she runs into her high school boyfriend, who is now engaged. Unbeknownst to Silk during all this, two mysterious figures are watching her whenever she is in the bunker.

As seen in the first issue of the Silk comic book title, she engages in battle against a costumed villain called Dragonclaw (whose name she says sounds like a Pokémon), and also engages in antagonism with Black Cat.

Spider-Man thinks she is not well and asks the Fantastic Four to check her. Silk consents to the check up but becomes annoyed when she finds out Peter revealed the history about her bunker and Ezekiel to them. It is revealed that Silk is physically fine, but is dealing with anxiety issues, and is referred to a therapist (who she eventually visits in the seventh issue). She and Human Torch also go on a date of crime fighting despite Peter's protests.

During the "Last Days" part of the "Secret Wars" storyline, Cindy Moon begins her run as Silk and comes across Dragonclaw and defeats him. Later, she finds out Dragonclaw did this because he was in the debt of Black Cat. This was the reason for his misdeeds and the tries to help him out by enlisting the help of Spider-Man to find Black Cat's gang causing a show down between Silk and Black Cat which leads to Silk cutting her hair to escape. While this was going on, it is shown that Silk is still much confused as to what has happened to her family and ex-boyfriend which led her to take a job under J. Jonah Jameson at the Fact Channel who takes an immediate liking to her as she suggests that they start taking photos of Silk. One day, J. Jonah Jameson looks at Cindy Moon's screen to find out that she was trying to find where her family is which also leads her to tell him everything about her. A couple of days pass and it is shown to be the final incursion between Earth-616 and Earth-1610 as time is running out. J. Jonah Jameson gives Silk a case file of a young boy who seems to be Silk's brother as he tells her this. She runs straight out going to the location on the file where she meets her brother. As the world is ending, Silk tells her brother "I'm sorry. For everything. And I love you, Albert. I love you."

As part of the "All-New, All-Different Marvel" branding, Silk is on a stakeout at a skating rink. Silk's spider-sense goes off as a group of Goblin Nation grunts rob a bank. Monologuing to herself, Silk reveals she'd been tailing the Goblin Nation for two weeks in order to avenge her brother who was infused with Goblin Formula and now has no memory of what happened to their parents. Extending claws, Silk slashes the Goblin Nation grunts' getaway car and webs them up, taking their loot, a safety deposit box containing Parker Industries tech. Thinking to herself that she has no idea what's in the safety deposit box just that her boss wants it, Silk returns to her now-employer Black Cat, who she is working with despite their earlier antagonism, who scolds her for showing mercy and tells her that being good is bad for business.

During the events in the Spider-Women event, Cindy learns her counterpart from Earth-65 (home of Spider-Gwen) is the cause of Gwen's powers, and has traveled to Prime Earth to steal and reverse engineer the technology of the greatest minds of the universe for war mongering. Upon confronting Cindy-65 with Spider-Gwen, Gwen loses her powers from Cindy-65's nanobots and Cindy-Prime's name as SILK is tarnished as a villain, so much so that her S.H.I.E.L.D. handler Mockingbird thinks she actually did the crimes she's accused of. After Black Cat's freeing of Silk from a S.H.I.E.L.D. prisoner convoy, Cindy chooses to stay with Black Cat (cont. undercover), and later went back to help Gwen and Jessica win the boss fight with Cindy-65, who utilized a gauntlet which replicates the abilities of the universes most formidable superhumans. Cindy, as a result of her Earth-65 counterpart's defamation, earns more of Black Cat's trust to gain deeper intelligence of her criminal operation, still intending to complete her mission and get whatever S.H.I.E.L.D. has on her family's whereabouts. Eventually, Black Cat discover her alliance with Mockingbird, prompting Silk to fight her. During the ensuing fight, Cindy falls into one of the dumpster, and was saved by a mysterious figure called Spectro, who was revealed to be Cindy's ex-boyfriend Hector.

It is revealed that Hector actually died (while Cindy was being held in the bunker) when a neighbor attempted to summon a demon in his apartment block, resulting in him wandering the Material World and only able to manage tangibility when in combat. Cindy's colleagues Rafferty and Lola at Fact Channel News discover her secret identity and Cindy embraces this opportunity to open up to them, which helps relief some of her feelings of loneliness in the world. Rafferty reveals that they have discovered Dr. Kapoor's lab, which has been abandoned for months but has a secret benefactor continually paying the rent. The three of them travel to the labs location, which unbeknownst to them is part of a trap for Silk by a villain called Fang. Shortly after they arrive at the lab, they discover a dimensional doorway which leads they to the Negative Zone. Upon journeying to the Negative Zone, Silk, Rafferty, and Lola relish the adventurous experience and befriend a medieval dragon called David. David explains the continuing war of the Red Knight against the evil forces of the Ash King and his army. He caught the scent of their arrival, which mimicked the arrival of a previously three (from the outer world) years ago. The three aid the Red Knight. After the battle is won, with the defeat of the Ash King, the Red King is revealed to be Cindy's mother Nari Moon. Nari explains to Cindy that she and her father, who has become a prisoner of the Ash King some time previously, had originally traveled to the Negative Zone in search of a blue substance they believed could be synthesized into an antidote for the spider bite that Cindy received and which would have nullified her powers, thus removing the threat of the Inheritors. Cindy's father Albert Moon Sr. is soon liberated from his prison and soon after the five say there goodbyes to their friends in the Negative Zone and re-enter the dimensional doorway. Mockingbird gives financial help to the family in the form of an abode in which to live, and the family begin building bridges with each other which places Cindy at a crossroads on what to do with her life next. What Cindy doesn't know is that Albert Moon Sr. is in possession of the mysterious blue substance and delivers it to Fang who claims it is time to "put an end to Silk once and for all..."

During the "Dead No More: The Clone Conspiracy" event, Cindy is glad to have her family back, but still feels distant from them and doesn't make as much of an effort to spend as much time with them. When J. Jonah Jameson wants one of his workers to investigate the New U Technologies scenario in San Francisco, Cindy volunteers to go to get away from the city as Hector (now calling himself Spectro) accompanies her. Jameson is enthusiastic for her that her family is back together and leaves for dinner, but Cindy found something off about his behavior. She and Hector decide to investigate Jameson's room in New U Technologies and she uses her powers to create a different costume from her Silk outfit to avoid suspicion. Hector calls her new identity "Silkworm" much to her annoyance. Cindy's suspicions are confirmed when she finds Jameson talking with his formerly deceased wife Marla while Spectro finds a room with a number of test subjects in capsules. Spectro triggers the intruder alert, prompting Cindy to escape. Before Cindy can leave, she's attacked by the resurrected Spider-Woman Mattie Franklin. Silk fights Mattie Franklin on the top of the roof of New U Technologies. When Mattie Franklin claims to Silk that New U Technologies is doing things for good purposes and offers her a tour in exchange for removing her mask, Silk gets away. At Fact Channel, Rafferty and Lola look more into New U Technologies and tell Cindy they'll update her with more information. Cindy is then approached in her apartment by J. Jonah Jameson. Cindy gives her Rafferty and Lola's research to voice skepticism on the New U Technologies and Jameson invites her to join him on a quick trip to the facility. He tells Cindy that he believes they're doing good work and introduces her to Mattie and Marla. After J. Jonah Jameson and Marla leave for Marla's treatment, Mattie tells Cindy that she knows she's Silk and takes her to investigate the facility. Mattie tells her that she's suspicious of the whole experiment as some of the other resurrected characters have been showing slight behavioral glitches and takes her to a place called "Haven" where they find Hector back in his own body. Back at Cindy's home, Mr. Moon has hidden a package that Cindy wanted Albert to open and tells Rafferty and Lola to stay out of their business while receiving instructions from a mysterious woman. At "Haven," an alarm goes off and starts affecting all the resurrected clones. Hector starts becoming Spectro again and prepares to attack Cindy. J. Jonah Jameson's broadcast causes the Carrion virus to start spreading worldwide. Mattie helps Cindy deal with Hector who reverts to his ghostly form after his cloned body disintegrates. The three of them head up to the broadcast center, where the Carrion Virus quickly spreads due to Marla Jameson opening the doors. Spider-Man and Anna Maria Marconi arrive to stop the broadcast as Mattie reveals to J. Jonah Jameson her superpowers. Silk holds the door back to prevent more infected hosts coming in and Mattie saves her from one of the carriers infecting her and passes out in the process. After Spider-Man sends out the Webware Emergency Signal, J. Jonah Jameson and Silk find Marla and Mattie reduced to dust.

Following the incident, Cindy quits her job at the Fact Channel and contemplates what she wants to do with her life. After a discussion with her brother, therapist, and helping a child free his kite in the graveyard (which she was visiting to see Mattie's grave), she decides to enlist in S.H.I.E.L.D. academy. With S.H.I.E.L.D.'s technology, she researches her father's meetings and eventually confronts him about his secret meetings with a mysterious doctor, who turns about to be a Tamara Pearson aka Fang. Fang worked for Ezekiel and was the leader of a splinter group of the spider society, and while she claims to Cindy's father that she will be "curing" Cindy of her powers, her actual plan is to transfer Cindy's powers to herself and use her abilities to take over the Spider Society. After inheriting Ezekiel's fortune and drugging Cindy's father, she's kept her eyes on Cindy during her time during and after the bunker. Silk defeats Fang with the help of Hector and her father accepts her for who she is. With her family closer, her job at S.H.I.E.L.D., and with Rafferty and Lola married, Cindy finally feels happiness after a long time.

The Protectors
Silk joins several other Asian American superheroes (Hulk (Amadeus Cho), Shang-Chi, Ms. Marvel, Jimmy Woo and S.H.I.E.L.D. agent Jake Oh) for a fundraiser in Flushing, Queens. Later while the group is spending the night out in Koreatown, Manhattan they are ambushed by the alien Prince Regent Phalkan and his small army from Seknarf Seven. Silk and her friends briefly fight off the invaders before they and a large group of bystanders are teleported near Seknarf Seven, where Phalkan demands that the group offer a few people for food within a time limit. Dubbing their group "The Protectors", Woo rallies the group and bystanders into working together to escape, while Shang-Chi leads an attack with Silk and Ms. Marvel. The Protectors are eventually able to free themselves and defeat Phalkan and his forces with the help of the bystanders. The Alpha Flight Space Program arrives to rescue the Protectors and bystanders and arrest Phalkan, who Sasquatch reveals was exiled from Seknarf Seven for treason.

Post-solo series
During the Go Down Swinging storyline, Silk along with Miles Morales helps Spider-Man in his fight against the Red Goblin (Green Goblin possessed by the Carnage symbiote). They are injured by the Red Goblin during the fight and later saved by Flash Thompson.

War of the Realms
After taking part in a demonstration for Jimmy Woo's Pan-Asian School for the Unusually Gifted in Mumbai, Silk and the Protectors are offered membership to Jimmy's Agents of Atlas. Silk and the others are suddenly alerted by the news of Malekith's invasion of Earth; most of the New Agents of Atlas head to Seoul while Ms. Marvel joins Jake Oh and the Champions in New York. Silk and the others defend Seoul from Malekith's ally Queen Sindr and her Fire Goblin forces from Muspelheim with help from the Korean heroes White Fox, Crescent, Io and Luna Snow. Cindy immediately recognizes Luna, as she is a big fan of the K-pop star. After Sindr threatens to summon a volcano in the middle of the city and kill millions of innocents, Brawn teleports Atlas and their new allies away from the battle, allowing Sindr to peacefully annex South Korea Brawn eventually summons the Chinese heroes Sword Master and Aero, Filipina heroine Wave, and the Hawaiian Goddess of Fire and Volcanoes Pele from Shanghai to help assist in the fight against Sindr. The newly summoned heroes are less than pleased for being taken out of their previous battle, but Pele quickly puts a stop to the infighting, warning the group that Sindr plans to melt the polar ice caps if they don't work together. After formulating a plan, Brawn confronts Sindr and her forces directly while Aero, Wave and Luna use Sindr's black Bifrost to travel to the Arctic to decrease its temperature; Silk the others are teleported to Atlas' ally Monkey King of the Ascendants in Northern China where Shang-Chi begins training the remaining members for their final fight. As planned by Brawn, the Queen of Cinders arrives in Northern China with a captured Brawn; Silk sneaks up on an unsuspecting Sindr while she is flying on her dragon and uses her webbing to free Brawn who then forces Sindr to crash land. Sindr is then ambushed by the agents, who defeat Sindr with Shang-Chi's training, although Pele (who is revealed to be M-41 Zu, a mystically enhanced Atlas Android) and Monkey King sacrifice themselves in the process. Despite given the chance to surrender, Sindr flees using the Black Bifrost, only for Silk and the others to follow her with Brawn's teleporter, where they help Captain Marvel defeat her and her remaining forces at the Great Wall of China near Beijing. After Malekith's defeat, Silk is seen with the other Agents in Shanghai looking on while the captured Fire Goblins are escorted back to Muspelheim.

New Agents of Atlas
Shortly after the War of the Realms event, Silk and a few members of the new agents are seen in Madripoor fighting one of Sindr's remaining Fire Dragons, where they encounter Isaac Ikeda, the self-proclaimed "Protector of Pan", who uses his technologically advanced weaponry to slay the dragon and teleports away with its corpse. Afterwards, Cindy goes with Luna, Aero, and Wave to Tokyo to attend one of Luna's rehearsals. While the four are in Luna's studio, they are interrupted when a white light engulfs the city. Cindy and the others, who are reunited with the other Atlas agents and Giant-Man discover the cities they were in (along with other Asian, Pacific and predominantly Asian cities outside of Asia) have been merged and connected together with portals made from Ikeda's technology. Mike Nguyen of the Big Nguyen Company reveals himself to be behind the newly merged city, "Pan", which he states for 24 hours would allow every citizen to easily explore each other's respective cities without any political and economic restrictions. Shortly after the announcement, Pan is suddenly beset by wyverns, which the agents and Ikeda confront. After driving the wyverns off, the group is praised by Nguyen for their heroics, who offers to enlist the agents as Pan's protectors along with Ikeda as well as giving them lifetime Pan Passes. A suspicious Amadeus rejects the offer, saying that the group are Agents of Atlas. During a banquet held in the Mumbai section of Pan, Amadeus confides with Cindy about his suspicions regarding Nguyen and Ikeda. Cindy, along with Brawn, Luna and Giant-Man team up with Ikeda to save several Madripoorian refugees from sea serpents; the refugees had been arrested earlier by the Pan Guard before Brawn and Luna intervened. Nguyen clears up the misunderstanding, claiming that the Madripoorians had been out of range during Pan's activation and the Pan Guard mistakenly believed they were trespassing with help from invading serpents; Nguyen has the refugees escorted to the Pan Grand Hotel as special guests. When Amadeus summons the team to the Atlas secret bunker in Seoul, they are unexpectedly joined by Ikeda, who Raz invited. When Amadeus objects, Cindy notes that her spider-sense didn't go off, making Ikeda trustworthy. When Ikeda is interrogated by Amadeus the team about his and Nguyen's motives, Issac explains that he was hired by Nguyen due to his expertise in fighting dragons, but offers little about Nguyen. Isaac has his own suspicions of Mike and suggests that the Atlas agents to join him as Pan's protectors as it would be easier for them to gather information about the Big Nguyen Company on the inside. Amadeus reluctantly agrees to have the team continue helping Pan and to find out more about Nguyen; when the team goes their separate ways to different Pan sectors, Amadeus and Silk go to the Pan Grand Hotel to check on the Madripoorian refugees. Unbeknownst to the agents, their actions are being monitored by Jimmy and Mr. Lao, the dragon adviser to the Atlas Foundation. During their investigation, Brawn, Silk and White Fox discover that the central heart of Pan doesn't correspond with any known location on Earth, which causes Amadeus to deduce that the city is in a separate dimension. Amadeus becomes more suspicious when one of the Madripoorian refugees tells him and Silk about hearing dragons roaring from Nguyen's personal tower. Discovering a photograph of Jimmy and Nguyen together in Jimmy's office in the Mumbai sector of Pan, Shang-Chi relays this to the group and finds a laptop that broadcasts the sound of a dragon's roar from Nguyen's tower in the Heart of Pan. Silk, Brawn, Sword Master and White Fox break into Nguyen's tower and discover a sea serpent imprisoned in a lab, while Shang-Chi and Crescent discover a secret tunnel in Jimmy's office that takes them to the Atlas Foundation's headquarters in the Pan sector of San Francisco, where they come face to face with Jimmy and Mr. Lao, who introduces himself to the Atlas agents. Nguyen denies that he and Jimmy are in league with each other, other than signing nonaggression treaty between Atlas and Pan, which the agents just violated. Nguyen explains that since dragon scales contain magical properties associated with portals and teleportation, the imprisoned dragon was having its scales harvested to supply Pan's portal and teleportation technology. Suspecting the serpent's identity, Lao and Jimmy order to agents to free her lest awakening the wrath every dragon on the planet, while Nguyen and Ikeda argue that releasing the dragon will cause the portals to collapse, displacing every citizen and refugee that had settled in the portal-city. Before a decision can be made, a massive storm begins engulfing the city. While Ikeda reveals that the imprisoned dragon, which he captured a year ago for terrorizing the Mediterranean, is from Atlantis, an enraged Namor emerges from the waters off of Pan's coast and begins invading the city.

Atlantis Attacks
In the Atlantis Attacks storyline, Silk and the other New Agents of Atlas are summoned by Brawn during his confrontation with Namor. Namor demands the group to return the dragon stolen by the Big Nguyen Company in a day or else face the wrath of Atlantis before making his retreat. Shortly after the skirmish, Silk and the other New Agents are introduced to the original Agents of Atlas by Jimmy. Although the dragon is safely released from captivity, she promptly attacks Atlantis upon returning home. After Atlantis' scientists discover the source of the dragon's behavior to be an implant embedded in its scales, Namor accuses Brawn to be behind the deception and immediately flies to Pan for revenge, where he violently ambushes Brawn while he and Silk are on patrol and proceeds to attack Nguyen in his personal tower. After the Pan Guard and Brawn are able to push Namor's assault back to the ocean, Nguyen reveals to Silk and the other Atlas agents that he has recruited the Sirenas, the longtime enemies of Atlantis, to help defend Pan. After Namor is overpowered and captured by the Sirenas, Silk attends a meeting between Atlas, the Pan guard and the Sirenas. Rather than siding with either the Atlanteans or the Sirenas, Silk chooses to stay and defend Pan. When Ikeda and Wave announce their intention to side with the Sirenas, the disagreement escalates into a brawl between the two parties. During the commotion, Namor is able to break free from his prison. Namor swiftly subdues the combined group and flies back to the heart of Pan, threatening Nguyen and Pan's citizens as retribution for attacking his kingdom. A hologram of Nguyen offers an alliance between Pan, Atlantis and the Sirenas to Namor; before the king could retort the recovered Agents are able to catch up to Namor and resume fighting him. Brawn talks down the combatants and confronts Woo over the secrets that he's withheld from the team. Woo reveals to all that for thousands of years, ancient dragons have served as advisors for human rulers, with the Atlas Foundation having its own dragon, Mr. Lao, serving him as well. As fighting each other openly would raze the planet, dragons have used humans as proxies in their own personal conflicts against each other, making them responsible for almost every major war in history. Woo is content with this balance of power, but Nguyen suggests uniting the world under Pan, proposing to Namor and Woo that by harvesting the power of their dragons, they could overtake the rest of them. As Namor returns to Atlantis with Namora, Venus and Aero, the rest of the Agents uncover Nguyen in his personal bunker and confront him. Having anticipated this, Nguyen attaches a Sirena tech implant onto Amadeus, transforming him into the Hulk. Under Nguyen's control, the Hulk makes quick work of the Atlas Agents. To prevent any further invasions against Pan, Nguyen commands the Hulk to kill Namor, much to the shock and anger of Pan's citizens. In Atlantis, just as Wave is able to get Namor and Carina to come to a truce, Silk warns the group a mind-controlled Hulk is on his way to destroy Atlantis. With help from the Agents, Namor is able to isolate himself and the Hulk to a deserted island two miles from the Heart of Pan for their fight. Despite Namor and the Agents succeeding in reverting Hulk back into Brawn and freeing him from Nguyen's control, the shockwaves emitted by Amadeus as the Hulk have created a massive tsunami that is heading towards the Heart of Pan. Silk helps the citizens find shelter as Brawn and Namor use their powers to weaken the tsunami. The city is saved, although Nguyen dies protecting a Madripoorian refugee and her young son from the tsunami. One month later at the Heart of Pan, Woo announces to the Agents and Pan's new leadership at a banquet that Atlantis and the Sirenas have signed a non-aggression pact, recognizing Pan as an independent nation. Still feeling guilty for Nguyen's death and angered with Woo's machinations, Amadeus quits the team but reassures Silk that his comm will still be open to her.

Powers and abilities
Cindy gained her superpowers when she was bitten by a radioactive spider. These abilities are similar to the ones Peter Parker possesses. Cindy has superhuman strength, speed, durability, reflexes, and equilibrium. On their first meeting, Peter observed that she was even faster than him, though not quite as strong. Her "Spider Sense" is called "Silk Sense" and is far stronger than Peter's. Cindy has the ability to cling to most surfaces. She also has the ability to shoot webs out of her fingertips. Additionally, she has an eidetic memory.

Reception

Accolades

 In 2017, Gizmodo ranked Cindy Moon 3rd in their "Greatest Spider-Women of All Time" list.
 In 2017, Screen Rant ranked Cindy Moon 4th in their "28 Marvel Superheroes With Spider-Powers" list and 13th in their "Every Member Of The Spider-Man Family" list.
 In 2020, Scary Mommy included Cindy Moon in their "Looking For A Role Model? These 195+ Marvel Female Characters Are Truly Heroic" list.
 In 2020, CBR.com ranked Cindy Moon 6th in their "Marvel Comics: 10 Most Powerful Members Of Agents Of Atlas" list.
 In 2022, Screen Rant ranked Cindy Moon (from Earth-65) 7th in their "10 Most Powerful Silk Villains In Marvel Comics" list.
In 2021, Dan Slott apologized on Twitter for "playing into racial stereotypes" and that "story choices were a mistake".

Other versions

Earth-65
In the crossover event Spider-Women, it is revealed that Cindy Moon of the Spider-Gwen universe is the head of a nefarious spy organization called S.I.L.K., the romantic partner of Matt Murdock / Kingpin, and the main antagonist of the event. Cindy of Earth-65 almost had a similar spider bite accident to the main one, but a teacher swatted it with a newspaper. Dissatisfied with her life, she joins S.H.I.E.L.D. as a researcher in spiders. There was a spider-related incident in which Jesse Drew was nearly killed, but Cindy's research saves his life and gives him spider powers, with Agent Drew making it up to Cindy by becoming one of her top agents. She eventually recovers the altered spider back from S.H.I.E.L.D. with Jesse's help and releases it into the open, where it bit Gwen Stacy and led to her becoming Earth-65's Spider-Woman. During the Spider-Women event, Jesse steals Gwen's interdimensional teleporter and travels to Earth-616, where she steals a large amount of technology while framing her 616 counterpart. When she encounters Gwen and her counterpart, she uses her technology to take away Gwen's powers. When she returns to her hideout after Jesse's betrayal, she is ambushed by Jessica Drew, Gwen, and her counterpart and is defeated. S.H.I.E.L.D. locks her up for her crimes and her counterpart teases her by sending her a care package with all the things she had in her bunker.

The Earth-616 Silk had managed to meet the parents of her Earth-65 counterpart.

In other media

Television
A live-action TV series based on Silk is in the works at Sony Pictures Television. Phil Lord and Christopher Miller will serve as executive producers alongside Amy Pascal, while Lauren Moon and Amazon Prime Video are in talks to write and distribute the series respectively. Tom Spezialy was hired as showrunner for the series, while also serving as an executive producer alongside Moon. MGM+ and Amazon later ordered to series under the title Silk: Spider Society, with Angela Kang serving as the showrunner.

Film
 Cindy Moon appears in films set in the Marvel Cinematic Universe (MCU), portrayed by Tiffany Espensen:
 She first appears in Spider-Man: Homecoming (2017) as a classmate of Peter Parker and decathlon team member.
 Cindy makes a cameo appearance in Avengers: Infinity War (2018).
 Cindy returns in the post-credits scene of the extended edition of Spider-Man: No Way Home (2021) via archive and previously unused footage from Spider-Man: Homecoming.
 Sony Pictures was developing a film based on Silk set in the Sony Pictures Universe of Marvel Characters.
 Cindy Moon / Silk was originally considered to appear in Spider-Man: Into the Spider-Verse, but the filmmakers chose to use Peni Parker instead.
 Silk will appear in a spin-off film focusing on three generations of female Spider-related characters alongside Jessica Drew / Spider-Woman and Gwen Stacy / Spider-Gwen.

Video games
 Silk appears as an unlockable playable character in Spider-Man Unlimited.
 Silk appears as an unlockable playable character in Marvel: Avengers Alliance.
 Silk appears as an unlockable playable character in Marvel Avengers Academy, voiced by Victoria Wong.
 Silk appears as an unlockable playable character in Marvel Future Fight.
 Silk appears as an unlockable playable character in Marvel Puzzle Quest.
 Silk appears as an unlockable playable character in Lego Marvel Super Heroes 2.

Merchandise
 Silk received a figure in HeroClix's "Superior Foes of Spider-Man" line.
 Silk received an action figure in the Marvel Legends line as part of the Spaceknight Venom Build-A-Figure set.

Collected editions

References

External links

 
 
 Silk at Comic Vine

2014 comics debuts
Asian-American superheroes
Characters created by Dan Slott
Comics characters introduced in 2014
Fictional characters from Manhattan
Fictional characters with precognition
Fictional characters with eidetic memory
Fictional high school students
Fictional reporters
Fictional female secret agents and spies
Marvel Comics characters who can move at superhuman speeds
Marvel Comics characters with accelerated healing
Marvel Comics characters with superhuman strength
Marvel Comics mutates
Marvel Comics female superheroes
S.H.I.E.L.D. agents
Spider-Man characters
Fictional women soldiers and warriors
Korean superheroes
Vigilante characters in comics